Tiw, in Uru (a pre-Incan people) mythology is a protector of mines, lakes, and rivers. It is closely related to the Aymara deity of Anchanchu, a terrible demon which haunts caves, rivers, and other isolated places.

See also
El Tío

References

Tutelary deities
Uru deities